Christophe Larrouilh  is a French football coach.

Career
Christophe was in charge of Thailand Premier League side BEC Tero Sasana from 2008 to 2009. He had been in charge of JMG Academy for 5 years, and was working for JMG academies in Madagascar and Ivory Coast. He was one of many foreigners evacuated from Ivory Coast in 2004 as political turmoil in the nation reached its climax.

References

Year of birth missing (living people)
Living people
Christophe Larrouilh
Expatriate football managers in Thailand
French football managers